Semophylax verecundum is a moth in the family Gelechiidae. It was described by Mikhail Mikhailovich Omelko  in 1988. It is found in Vietnam.

References

Gelechiinae
Moths described in 1988